North Bolivian Quechua is a dialect of the Southern Quechua language, spoken in northern Bolivia on the Peruvian border, as well as by immigrants in Peru.

References 

Languages of Peru
Southern Quechua

Languages of Bolivia